The 2016–17 World Rugby Sevens Series, known for sponsorship reasons as the HSBC World Rugby Sevens Series, was the 18th annual series of rugby sevens tournaments for national rugby sevens teams. The Sevens Series has been run by World Rugby since 1999–2000. South Africa won the Series with a comfortable 28-point margin over England; South Africa won five of the ten tournaments.

The 2016–17 Series also served as a qualifying tournament for the 2018 Rugby World Cup Sevens. Nine of the core teams had already qualified but the four highest-placed finishers from among the remaining six core teams also gained qualification for the 2018 RWC Sevens.

Core teams

Tour venues
The official schedule for the 2016–17 World Rugby Sevens Series was as follows:

There were no major changes to the schedule.

Standings
Final table:

Source: World Rugby. Archived 

{| class="wikitable" style="font-size:92%;"
|-
!colspan=2| Legend
|- style="line-height:18px; font-size:90%;"
|colspan=2 align=center |Qualification for the 2017–18 World Sevens Series
|-
|No colour
|Core team in 2016–17 and re-qualified as a core team for the 2017–18 World Rugby Sevens Series
|-
|bgcolor=#fcc|Pink
|Relegated as the lowest placed core team at the end of the 2016–17 season
|-
|bgcolor=#ffc|Yellow
|Not a core team
|- style="line-height:18px; font-size:90%;"
|colspan=2 align=center |Qualification for 2018 Rugby World Cup Sevens
|-
|colspan=2 style="border-left:3px solid #06f;"| Already confirmed for 2018 (host country United States and 2013 quarterfinalists)
|-
|colspan=2 style="border-left:3px solid #7cf;"| Qualified as one of the four highest placed eligible teams from the 2016–17 World Rugby Sevens Series not already qualified. 
|}

Players

Scoring leaders

Updated: 22 May 2017

Dream Team

Placings summary
Tallies of top four tournament placings during the 2016–17 series, by team:

Tournaments
In this series, World Rugby abolished the minor trophies of Plate, Bowl and Shield that were previously awarded in the finals play-offs at each tournament. While the winner's Cup was retained as the major trophy, the awarding of gold, silver and bronze medals to players from the three respective top-placed teams was introduced for this series with the third placed match now renamed as the Bronze medal match. A Challenge Trophy was established for teams competing in the lower bracket of the finals play-offs at each tournament. Additionally, the playing time for Cup final matches was reduced from 20 minutes to 14 minutes, in line with all other tournament matches.

Dubai

Cape Town

Wellington

Sydney

Las Vegas

Vancouver

Hong Kong

Singapore

Paris

London

See also

 2016–17 World Rugby Women's Sevens Series

References

External links
Official Site

 
World Rugby Sevens Series